Charles Edward Plumb (1864–1930) was an Anglican priest in the first third of the  20th century.

Plumb was educated at the Royal Grammar School Worcester and Magdalen College, Oxford. He was ordained in 1881. After  curacies in West Bromwich and Witney he was a Tutor at  St Aidan's College, Birkenhead, and then Principal of  St Stephen's House, Oxford. During this time he was also Chaplain of his old college. From 1904 to 1908 he was  Provost of St Ninian's Cathedral, Perth,  when he ascended to the episcopate as the 4th bishop of St Andrews, Dunkeld and Dunblane. He died in post on 26 November 1930.

References

1864 births
People educated at the Royal Grammar School Worcester
Alumni of Magdalen College, Oxford
Provosts of St Ninian's Cathedral, Perth
Bishops of Glasgow and Galloway
20th-century Scottish Episcopalian bishops
1930 deaths
Principals of St Stephen's House, Oxford